Nicolas Camí (born January 16, 1981, in Pau, France), is a French footballer, who currently plays for Pau FC.

Career
Since January 2007 he has been playing for the Racing Club of Ferrol. His other clubs have been Bordeaux B, 1999–2002; Pau, 2002–2005; and Sète, 2005–2007.

References

1981 births
French footballers
French expatriate footballers
Expatriate footballers in Spain
Living people
Racing de Ferrol footballers
Ligue 2 players
FC Sète 34 players
Pau FC players
Association football midfielders
Sportspeople from Pau, Pyrénées-Atlantiques
Footballers from Nouvelle-Aquitaine